Hunting plc is a British-based supplier to the oil and gas industry. Some 27% of the business is owned by the Hunting family. It is listed on the London Stock Exchange and is a constituent of the FTSE 250 Index.

History
The company was founded in 1874 by Charles Hunting, a veterinary surgeon, as a shipping business. The business, originally known as Hunting & Pattison, was managed by the founder's son, Charles Samuel Hunting, and comprised two sailing ships, the Genii and the Sylvia. In the 1890s the company invested in oil tankers and became a tanker broker. In the 1930s and 1940s, it diversified into aircraft maintenance and manufacturing as well as air transport, establishing Hunting Aircraft in 1944 by the purchase of Percival Aircraft: this business was absorbed into the British Aircraft Corporation in 1960.

At the end of 1945, Hunting entered the airline business and established Hunting Air Travel Ltd, a business headquartered at Luton Airport. The new airline began commercial operations from Bovingdon Airport at the start of 1946. In 1951, Hunting Air Travel changed its name to Hunting Air Transport. Another change of name occurred in late 1953, when Hunting Air Transport became Hunting-Clan Air Transport. This change of name resulted from the Hunting family's decision to split the group and to transfer their airline business to a new holding company which they had set up together with the Scottish Clan Line, a rival shipping company owned by the Cayzer family.

In June 1998, Hunting Cargo Airlines was sold to a consortium consisting of CMB (Belgium) and Safair (part of the Imperial Group) and rechristened ACL (Air Contractors Limited). In the 1990s, Hunting became involved in defence contracts, notably, in 1993, being a member of the winning consortium contracted to manage the Atomic Weapons Establishment, a contract that lasted until 2003. More recently, it refocused on its core oil and gas activities.

In December 2008, it completed the disposal of Gibson Energy, its operation transporting and marketing crude oil in Canada, for a total consideration of £517m. On 16 August 2010, Hunting PLC announces the acquisition of Innova-Extel Acquisition Holdings Inc. for a cash consideration of US$125 million. On 5 August 2011 Hunting announced the acquisition of Titan Group for $775 million. On 12 August 2011 Hunting announced the acquisition of Dearborn Precision Tubular Products for US83.5 million.

As of 1 September 2017, Jim Johnson was promoted from the role of COO to the role of CEO to replace Dennis Proctor.

Current operations
Operations include:
Well Construction: provides products and services for the construction phase of the wellbore development.
Well Completion: provides products and services that support the completion and re-completion phases of wellbore development. 
Well Intervention: provides products and services that support the intervention and subsea support phases of wellbore production and maintenance.

See also
 List of oilfield service companies

References

Sources
  (various backdated issues relating to Hunting Air Travel, Hunting Air Transport and Hunting-Clan Air Transport, 1946-1960)

External links
 Official site

Companies based in the City of Westminster
Companies established in 1874
Engineering companies of the United Kingdom
Oilfield services companies
Companies listed on the London Stock Exchange
1874 establishments in England